Prinzregententorte is a Bavarian torte consisting of at least six, usually seven, thin layers of sponge cake interlaid with chocolate buttercream. The exterior is covered in a dark chocolate glaze. Prinzregententorte is very popular in Bavaria, Germany, and available in cake shops all year round.

Origin
The cake is named after Luitpold, prince regent of Bavaria from 1886. The cake's exact origin remains in dispute; among those claimed as its creators are the prince regent's cook, Johann Rottenhoeffer, the baker Anton Seidl, and the baking firm of Heinrich Georg Erbshäuser.

A Prinzregententorte originally had eight layers of both cake and cream, so as to represent the eight districts the Kingdom of Bavaria once had. Since one of those regions, the Palatinate, was split off from Bavaria and merged with surrounding lands to form the new federal state of Rhineland-Palatinate by the American Military Government after World War II, which the locals later confirmed in a plebiscite, the double-layers were subsequently reduced to seven.

Recipe
Apricot jam may be added to the topmost layer, and the whole cake is covered in dark chocolate.

In popular culture 
The Prinzregententorte appeared in series 12, episode 5, of the Great British Bake Off, as the technical challenge.

See also

Doberge cake
Dobos Torte
Rigo Jancsi, another famous Hungarian dessert created in the same era
Sachertorte
Smith Island cake, official dessert of the state of Maryland.
Spekkoek, a Dutch layered cake
List of cakes
 List of desserts
 List of German desserts

References

Irene Krauß: Chronik bildschöner Backwerke. Hugo Matthaes Druckerei und Verlag, Stuttgart 1999,

External links
A recipe in English for Prinzregententorte
Prue Leith's recipe in English for Prinzregententorte

Bavarian cuisine
German cakes
1886 introductions
Chocolate cakes